The Genius of Universal Emancipation was an abolitionist newspaper founded by Benjamin Lundy in 1821, in Mount Pleasant, Ohio.

History 
The newspaper was originally Elihu Embree's The Emancipator in 1820, before Lundy purchased it the following year. Lundy's contributions reflected his Quaker views, condemning slavery on moral and religious grounds and advocating for gradual emancipation and the resettlement of freed slaves in other countries, including Haiti, Canada, and Liberia. The paper attracted few readers in Ohio, so Lundy moved his base of operations to Greeneville, Tennessee, in an attempt to spread his ideas in a slave state. Although the paper gained national circulation through twenty-one states, Tennessee slave owners were not very receptive to Lundy's publications, and he realized the newspaper could have greater impact on the East Coast. In 1824, he moved The Genius to Baltimore, Maryland, where it would spend most of its publishing life. The paper would later be moved to Washington and then Philadelphia, and Lundy continued to publish irregularly until his death in 1839.

Editors

Benjamin Lundy 
Benjamin Lundy, considered by some as "The First Abolitionist", was born to Quaker parents in 1789, in Sussex County, New Jersey. Lundy was taught to be opposed to slavery at a young age. While working as a saddle maker in Wheeling, Virginia, Lundy witnessed the slave trade for the first time, thus beginning his career in abolitionism. At the time, the abolitionist movement had been losing momentum. In 1815, Lundy revived the movement by establishing The Union Humane Society, which sought gradual emancipation of slaves through legislation and to provide aid to freed slaves. Six years later, Lundy founded The Genius. The paper alternated between monthly and weekly publications, as Lundy spent much of his time traveling to give speeches or to other countries for potential freed slaves. While on a trip to Haiti, Lundy's wife, Esther, died in childbirth, leaving him a single father of twins. As Lundy found himself with less time to devote to the paper, he met William Lloyd Garrison, and offered him an editing position. After Lundy and Garrison parted ways over the "Black List," Lundy began working closely with John Quincy Adams to establish freedman's colonies in Mexico, after Mexico abolished slavery completely in 1829. However, Texas revolted in 1836, and effectively ended any chances of such colonies being established. During this time, Lundy hired multiple assistants to keep the paper going, and its publishing regularity faltered. He moved the paper to Washington, then to Philadelphia, where it stopped publishing in 1835. In Philadelphia, he began publishing another newspaper, The National Enquirer and Constitutional Advocate for Liberty, until it too stopped scheduled publications and fell into financial trouble. Lundy decided to move to Illinois, where his family was, and was invited to store his work and belongings in Pennsylvania Hall, which was used to host meetings about political topics, especially slavery. Lundy attended the Anti-Slavery Convention of American Women in Pennsylvania Hall, but on the second day of the convention, pro-slavery pamphlets began circulating the city advocating for "property rights", and on the fourth day of the convention, disaster struck when an angry mob burned down Pennsylvania Hall, including all of Lundy's work and possessions. He moved to Putnam County, Illinois, built a small house and printing shop, and reestablished The Genius. Later that year, Lundy became very ill and he died on August 22, 1839, in debt and with few physical records of his abolitionist work remaining.

William Lloyd Garrison 
In 1829, Lundy recruited the young William Lloyd Garrison to join him in Baltimore, Maryland, and help him edit the paper. Garrison's experience as a printer and newspaper editor allowed him to revamp the layout of the paper and free Lundy to spend more time traveling as an antislavery speaker. The two first met in Boston on one of Lundy's speaking tours; this meeting marked the start of Garrison's career in abolitionism. Initially, Garrison shared Lundy's gradualist views, but he eventually became convinced of the need to demand immediate and complete emancipation. Lundy and Garrison continued to work together on the paper in spite of their differing views, agreeing simply to sign their editorials to indicate who had written it.

One of the regular features that Garrison introduced during his time at the Genius was "the Black List," a column devoted to printing short reports of "the barbarities of slavery—kidnappings, whippings, murders." One of Garrison's "Black List" columns reported that a shipper from Garrison's hometown of Newburyport, Massachusetts—one Francis Todd—was involved in the slave trade, and that he had recently had slaves shipped from Baltimore to New Orleans on his ship Francis. Todd filed a suit for libel against both Garrison and Lundy, filing in Maryland in order to secure the favor of pro-slavery courts. The state of Maryland also brought criminal charges against Garrison, quickly finding him guilty and ordering him to pay a fine of $50 and court costs. (Charges against Lundy were dropped on the grounds that he had been traveling and not in control of the newspaper when the story was printed.) Garrison was unable to pay the fine and was sentenced to a jail term of six months. He was released after seven weeks when the antislavery philanthropist Arthur Tappan donated the money for the fine, but Garrison had decided to leave Baltimore and he and Lundy mutually agreed to part ways. Garrison returned to New England, and soon began his own abolitionist newspaper, The Liberator. Garrison would go on to lead the abolitionist movement right up until the Emancipation Proclamation. Even though Garrison and Lundy parted ways after his arrest, when Lundy died, Garrison said, "It is to Benjamin Lundy that I owe all that I am as a friend of the slave."

Extant holdings, reprints, and digital facsimiles
 Genius of Universal Emancipation
 (microfilm); 
 
 Filmed from the New York Public Library (microfiche); 
 ProQuest (microfilm); 
 Gale (microfiche); 
 Gale (online); 
 

 Genius of Universal Emancipation and Baltimore Courier
 ProQuest (online); 

 The Genius of Universal Emancipation and Quarterly Anti-Slavery Review (1837–1839)

See also
Abolitionist publications

References

Notes

Sources
 Dykhouse. "The Genius of Universal Emancipation," Michigan State University
 Mayer, Henry. All on Fire: William Lloyd Garrison and the Abolition of Slavery. (W.W. Norton, 2008) .
 Shah, Sujal. "Vocal Abolitionism and The Genius of Universal Emancipation," Sujal.net.
 Vaughn, Stephen L. (editor) Encyclopedia of American Journalism (Routledge, 2009), p. 4
 Wicks, Suzanne R. "Benjamin Lundy, Quaker Abolitionist," Friends Journal (June 2002).

Defunct newspapers published in Maryland
Defunct newspapers published in Ohio
Abolitionist newspapers published in the United States
Publications established in 1821
Publications disestablished in 1839
William Lloyd Garrison